Type 81 may refer to:

Type 81 (missile)
Type 81 assault rifle
Tribal class frigate, designated as Type 81
Type 81 variant of the BM-21 Grad multiple rocket launcher